Lake Langui Layo is a lake in Peru.

See also
List of lakes of Peru

References
INEI, Compendio Estadistica 2007, page 26

Lakes of Peru
Lakes of Cusco Region